Chenar-e Sofla (also Romanized as Chenār-e Soflá; also known as Cham Kabūd-e Chenār, Chenār, Cheshmeh Kabūd Chenār, and Cheshmeh Kabūd-e Chenār) is a village in Jalalvand Rural District, Firuzabad District, Kermanshah County, Kermanshah Province, Iran. At the 2006 census, its population was 52, in 11 families.

References 

Populated places in Kermanshah County